Edward, Eddie or Ed Johnson may refer to:

Politicians
Edward Johnson (founder of Woburn, MA) (1598–1672), colonial military officer and writer
Edward Johnson (mayor) (1767–1829), mayor of Baltimore
Edward A. Johnson (1860–1944), first African American elected to New York state legislature
Edward Johnson (British politician) (1834–1895), Member of Parliament for Exeter, 1880–1885
Eddie Bernice Johnson (born 1935), American politician
B. Ed Johnson (1914–1983), American businessman, broadcaster and politician from Georgia

Cultural figures
Ed Johnson (broadcaster) (G. Edwin Johnson, died 2001), farm broadcaster from Delaware, Ohio, founder of Agri Broadcasting Network
Edward Johnson (tenor) (1878–1959), Canadian tenor and manager of the Metropolitan Opera 
Edward Johnson (composer) (1572–1601), English composer
Teddy Johnson (born 1920), English entertainer, see Pearl Carr & Teddy Johnson
Eddie Johnson (musician) (1920–2010), American jazz musician
Edward Johnson (actor), British actor

Sports figures
Ed Johnson (American football) (born 1983), American football player
Ed Johnson (baseball) (1899–1975), American Major League outfielder
Ed Johnson (basketball) (1944–2016), American basketball center
Eddie Johnson (American soccer) (born 1984), American soccer player
Eddie Johnson (racing driver) (1919–1974), American racecar driver
Eddie Johnson (English footballer) (born 1984), English footballer
Edward Johnson (footballer, born 1860) (1860–1901), English footballer
Eddie Johnston (born 1935), Canadian ice hockey player
Eddie Johnson (linebacker) (1959–2003), American football player
Eddie Johnson (punter) (born 1981), American football player
Eddie Johnson (basketball, born 1959), American basketball small forward
Eddie Johnson (basketball, born 1955) (1955–2020), American basketball guard
Eddie Johnson (boxer) (1927–1986), American Olympic boxer

Others
Edward Albert Johnson (1885–1949), member of the Early Birds of Aviation
Edward Johnson (general) (1816–1873), American Civil War
Edward Hibberd Johnson (1846–1917), inventor and business associate of American inventor Thomas Edison
Edward Mead Johnson (1852–1934), co-founder of Johnson and Johnson and Mead Johnson
Edward Earl Johnson (1960–1987), American murderer
Edward Daniel Johnson (1816–1889), London watch and chronometer maker
E. A. Johnson, Canadian plant ecologist
Ed Johnson (1882–1906), American lynch-mob victim, see Lynching of Ed Johnson
Edward Johnson III (1930–2022), American investor and businessman
Edward C. Johnson II (1898–1984), American businessman
Eddie T. Johnson (born 1959), Superintendent of Chicago Police Department 2016-2019

In fiction
Coffin Ed Johnson, a protagonist in Chester Himes's Harlem Detective novels
Cousin Eddie Johnson, a redneck character in the National Lampoon's Vacation film series, played in each case by Randy Quaid

See also
Ted Johnson (disambiguation)
Edward Johnston (disambiguation)
Edwin Johnson (disambiguation)
Edmund Johnson (1883–1955), Australian footballer